Jackson Square is the first full-length album by Arkells. It is their first non-digital release with Dine Alone Records. The album contains updated versions of the 5 songs found on the Deadlines EP along with 7 additional songs. The album is named after Lloyd D. Jackson Square, a shopping mall in the band's hometown of Hamilton, Ontario. The first single, "Oh, the Boss Is Coming!" was released on October 21, 2008. Lead singer Max Kerman describes Jackson Square as "Road-tested, energetic and soulful." On February 24, 2009, the band set up a webpage for fans to vote for the second single between "Pullin' Punches", "John Lennon" and "The Ballad of Hugo Chavez". Ultimately, "The Ballad of Hugo Chavez" was chosen and released to radio as a single on April 27, 2009.

Track listing
All songs written by Arkells.

Personnel
Max Kerman  – vocals, guitar
Mike DeAngelis – vocals, guitar
Dan Griffin – vocals, keyboard, guitar, percussion, harmonica
Nick Dika – bass
Tim Oxford – drums, percussion
Jon Drew – co-production
Arkells – co-production
Chris Gale – tenor sax, baritone sax
Wayne Cochrane, Jamie Krebs, Luke Marshall – assistant engineering
Noah Mintz/The Lacquer Channel – mastering

References

2008 debut albums
Arkells albums
Dine Alone Records albums
Albums recorded at Metalworks Studios